

Plants

Conifers

Angiosperms

Gnetophytes

Fungi

Arthropods

Arachnids

Insects

Conodont paleozoology 
German paleontologist and stratigrapher Heinz Walter Kozur (1942-2013) described the conodont genus Carnepigondolella.

Vertebrate paleozoology

Parareptiles

Non-avian dinosaurs 

Data courtesy of George Olshevsky's dinosaur genera list.

Newly named birds

Plesiosaurs

Pterosaurs

Synapsids

Non-mammalian

Mammals

References

 
2000s in paleontology
Paleontology